Liechtenstein competed at the 2000 Summer Olympics in Sydney, Australia.

Judo

Shooting

References
Official Olympic Reports

Nations at the 2000 Summer Olympics
2000
Summer Olympics